James Swift may refer to:
 James Swift (trade unionist) (1841/42–1904), British trade unionist
 James Swift (British Army officer), British Major-General
 James M. Swift (lawyer) (1873–1946), Attorney General of Massachusetts
 James M. Swift (American football) (fl. 1891), American football coach